Tayt (also Tait, Tayet, and Taytet) was an Egyptian goddess. Some attest her husband was Neper while others state she was possibly the consort of Hedjhotep.

Textile goddess
Tayt was the ancient Egyptian goddess of weaving, textiles, and to a lesser extent mummification. Her role was similar to Hedjhotep. The name Taytet originates from a word meaning garment. Because linen was the most common textile used in ancient Egypt, Tayt often wove or gave linen headdresses to deities and high-ranked officials. Statues of deities were clothed in high quality linen, the linen being considered divine due to its quality and attributes. Linen is derived from the stem of the flax plant: the younger the plant, the higher the grade and the higher the quality of the linen product. Due to linen's protective qualities, Tayt began being ascribed the role of a protective maternal figure. In Pyramid Text spell 738a, Tayt guards the pharaoh’s head, and helps him garner favor among other deities. In ancient Egypt, weaving was a popular commercial activity among workers’ women and royal women. Later, cotton was introduced to Egypt with the Roman Empire.

Funerary goddess
Tayt became associated as a funerary goddess through the application of mummification bandages. Tayt is known as a goddess who “awakes in peace” and is associated with textile offerings to garner favor from deities. As a funerary goddess, she is depicted in the Fifth Section of the Book of Caverns, which describes Ra’s journey through the underworld and his dealings with the damned. She is shown greeting Ra and Osiris in the lower register. In the  Pyramid Texts of the Fifth and Sixth Dynasties, Tayt is characterized as a motherly figure wrapping bandages on a dead king. Mummy bandages came from the “land of Tait.”

Goddess of Tait
Tayt was the tutelary goddess of the town Tait as referenced in one of the Pyramid Texts.

See also
 Neith, another goddess associated with weaving

References

Works cited
Editor, Hastings, James; Editor, Selbie, John Alexander; Editor, Gray, Louis Herbert. Encyclopedia of Religion and Ethics: Mundas-Phrygians. Andover-Harvard Theological Library.
"The goddess of weaving Tait". http://www.reshafim.org.il/ad/egypt/religion/tait.htm.
"Women's Clothing and Fashion in Ancient Egypt". http://www.womenintheancientworld.com/women%27s%20clothing.htm.
Willems, Harco (1996). The coffin of Heqata : (Cairo JdE 36418); a case study of Egyptian funerary culture of the Early Middle Kingdom. Leuven: Peeters [u.a.]. .
"The Book of Caverns". www.touregypt.net (in Russian). http://www.touregypt.net/featurestories/caverns.htm.
Nicholson, edited by Paul T.; Shaw, Ian (2000). Ancient Egyptian materials and technology (1. publ., repr. ed.). Cambridge: Cambridge Univ. Press. .

Further reading
 El-Saady, Hassan. "Reflections on the Goddess Tayet." The Journal of Egyptian Archaeology 80 (1994): 213-17. Accessed June 16, 2020. doi:10.2307/3821868.

Crafts goddesses
Egyptian death goddesses
Textiles in folklore
Tutelary deities